Laak is district of The Hague, Netherlands. The district is officially divided into three neighbourhoods: Laakkwartier, Spoorwijk and Binckhorst. The Hague University of Applied Sciences can be found in Laak.

The municipality of The Hague bought the area from the municipality of Rijswijk in 1844. The Amsterdam–Haarlem–Rotterdam railway was constructed in this polder, together with the railway station Hollands Spoor. In the period between 1915 and 1935, the municipality developed a residential neighbourhood in Laak, designed by Dutch architect Berlage.

References

Boroughs of The Hague